Samuel Johnson (19 October 1901 – 1975) was an English footballer.

Career
Johnson started his career with Stoke in 1924. After making 38 league appearances for the club, he joined Swindon Town in 1926. He joined York City in the summer of 1929, prior to their first season in the Football League, after making 35 appearances and scoring one goal in the league for Swindon. He made 137 appearances for the club and joined Southport in 1933. After making one league appearance for the club, he joined Crystal Palace in the same year. He joined Scarborough after making no league appearances for Palace.

Career statistics
Source:

References

1901 births
1975 deaths
People from Kidsgrove
English footballers
Association football defenders
Association football midfielders
Stoke City F.C. players
Swindon Town F.C. players
York City F.C. players
Southport F.C. players
Crystal Palace F.C. players
Scarborough F.C. players
English Football League players